South Branch is a community in the Canadian province of Nova Scotia, located in Colchester County. The Community is named for the South Branch of the Stewiacke River.

Navigator

References
South Branch on Destination Nova Scotia

Communities in Colchester County
General Service Areas in Nova Scotia